Physiology & Behavior is a peer-reviewed scientific journal published by Elsevier. It covers the fields of behavioral neuroendocrinology, psychoneuroimmunology, learning and memory, ingestion, social behavior, and studies related to the mechanisms of psychopathology. It was established in 1966 with Matthew J. Wayner as its founding editor-in-chief. The current editor-in-chief is Thomas Lutz (University of Zurich).

Abstracting and indexing
The journal is abstracted and indexed in BIOSIS, Chemical Abstracts, Current Contents/Life Sciences, MEDLINE, PsycINFO, Science Citation Index, Scopus, and PubMed. According to the Journal Citation Reports, the journal has a 2020 impact factor of 3.244.

References

External links 
 

Behavioral neuroscience
Neuroscience journals
Physiology journals
Publications established in 1966
English-language journals
Elsevier academic journals
Journals published between 13 and 25 times per year